The Fox Lake Subdivision is a railway line in the state of Illinois in the United States. It runs  from a junction with the C&M Subdivision of the Canadian Pacific Railway at Rondout, Illinois, to a junction with the Wisconsin and Southern Railroad at Fox Lake, Illinois. Metra, the commuter rail authority for the Chicago area, owns and operates the line. The line hosts Milwaukee District / North Line commuter trains. The line is part of the former Milwaukee Road route between Chicago and Madison, Wisconsin. The Wisconsin & Southern owns the portion between Fox Lake and Janesville, Wisconsin, and has trackage rights over the Metra portion. The tracks north of Metra's Fox Lake station host exclusively freight traffic.

References 

Metra
Rail lines in Illinois